The 1997 New England Patriots season was the franchise's 28th season in the National Football League and the 38th overall. They finished the season with a 10–6 record and a division title but lost in the playoffs to the Pittsburgh Steelers.

In January, when the Patriots were preparing to face the Green Bay Packers in Super Bowl XXXI, it was suspected head coach Bill Parcells was looking to move to another team after the game where he would have more say over personnel matters. In the 1996 NFL Draft, Parcells' relationship with owner Robert Kraft soured when Kraft selected wide receiver Terry Glenn against Parcells' wishes. After the Patriots' loss in Super Bowl XXXI, Parcells resigned from the Patriots, using the phrase "If they want you to cook the dinner, at least they ought to let you shop for some of the groceries." Due to an earlier renegotiation that had eliminated the 1997 season from Parcells' contract, NFL Commissioner Paul Tagliabue ruled Parcells could not be a head coach for another team in 1997. Parcells instead moved to the New York Jets as a "consultant", taking assistant head coach Bill Belichick with him to be the Jets' head coach; Kraft called this a "transparent farce" and accused the Jets of tampering with Parcells. The NFL ruled in the Patriots' favor and the Patriots received third and fourth-round picks in the 1997 NFL Draft, a second-round pick in the 1998 NFL Draft, and a first-round pick in the 1999 NFL Draft in compensation for allowing Parcells to become the Jets' head coach.

Taking Parcells' place with the Patriots was Pete Carroll, who had coincidentally been the Jets' head coach in 1994. The Patriots began the season 5–1 but later stumbled to a 6–5 record later in the season. The Patriots managed to finish 10–6 and first in the AFC East for the second straight season. With the third seed in the AFC playoffs, the Patriots defeated the Miami Dolphins 17-3 in the Wild Card Game but were defeated by the Pittsburgh Steelers, 7–6, on the road the next week.

1997 NFL draft

Staff

Schedule

Postseason

Schedule

Standings

Notable games
 August 31 v San Diego Chargers:
The Pete Carroll era of the Patriots started with a bang as Drew Bledsoe threw for 340 yards and four touchdowns in a 41–7 runaway.  Stan Humphries managed a touchdown throw but was pulled in the fourth quarter for Jim Everett; Everett was intercepted and Willie Clay ran back a 53-yard touchdown.

 September 14 v New York Jets:

The first game against former Patriots coach Bill Parcells came on Sunday Night Football with the Patriots 2–0 and the Jets 1–1.  The game became a grinder in which the lead tied or changed seven times.  Drew Bledsoe threw touchdowns to Ben Coates and Lovett Purnell but threw two picks (one returned by Mo Lewis for a touchdown) and was limited to just 162 passing yards.  His Jets counterpart Neil O'Donnell ran in one touchdown and threw another to Keyshawn Johnson that tied the game in the fourth, but was sacked seven times; the Jets also coughed up three fumbles.  Curtis Martin's running game erupted to 199 yards and a touchdown, but the Patriots faced Jets kicker John Hall in the final sixteen seconds with the game tied at 24.  Hall's field goal try was blocked and in overtime the Patriots drove down field and Adam Vinatieri nailed a 34-yard field goal for the 27–24 Patriots win.

 Monday Night Football October 6 v Denver Broncos:

The first game between the last two unbeaten NFL teams since 1973 after the Buccaneers lost on Sunday, the Broncos won for the tenth straight time over the Patriots, 34–13.  Despite throwing two interceptions and being limited to just 192 passing yards, John Elway ran in a touchdown and Terrell Davis rushed for 171 yards and two scores.

 October 19 @ New York Jets:
The 5–1 Patriots fell to Parcells' Jets 24–19 as the Jets outscored the Patriots 21–14 in the second half.  Neil O'Donnell was flagged for intentional grounding in the endzone for a Patriots safety, then was pulled for Glenn Foley; Foley threw for 200 yards and a touchdown.

Final roster

Notes

References

External links
Season page on Pro Football Reference

AFC East championship seasons
New England Patriots
New England Patriots seasons
New England Patriots
Sports competitions in Foxborough, Massachusetts